Stanley R. Palombo is a Washington, DC psychiatrist and psychoanalyst.   Palombo is the author of Dreaming and Memory: A New Information-Processing Model and The Emergent Ego: Complexity and Coevolution in the Psychoanalytic Process

References

Columbia University Vagelos College of Physicians and Surgeons alumni
Living people
Year of birth missing (living people)